The Indian state of Nagaland, has 16 administrative districts: Chümoukedima, Dimapur, Kiphire, Kohima, Longleng, Mokokchung, Mon, Niuland, Noklak, Peren, Phek, Shamator, Tuensang, Tseminyü, Wokha and Zünheboto.

Administration
A district of an Indian state is an administrative geographical unit, headed by a district magistrate or a deputy commissioner, an officer belonging to the Indian Administrative Service. The district magistrate or the deputy commissioner is assisted by a number of officials belonging to different wings of the administrative services of the state.

A superintendent of Police, an officer belonging to Indian Police Service is entrusted with the responsibility of maintaining law and order and related issues.

History
On 1 December 1957, the Naga Hills District of Assam and Tuensang Frontier Division of the North-East Frontier Agency (now Arunachal Pradesh) were joined to form the centrally governed Naga Hills Tuensang Area. At that point the previous subdivisions became Kohima District, Mokokchung District and Tuensang District. February 1961 saw the renaming of Naga Hills Tuensang Area to "Nagaland", and in December 1963 Nagaland became the 16th state of India.

December 19, 1973 saw the new districts of Wokha District and Zünheboto District carved out of Mokokchung District, Mon District carved from Tuensang District, and Phek District created out of Kohima District.

On 2 December 1997, Dimapur District was carved out from Kohima District and was inaugurated in April 1998.

Three more districts were added in 24th October 2003: Kiphire District, Longleng District and Peren District. Kiphire and Longleng Districts were carved out from Tuensang District, Peren District was carved from Kohima District.

Noklak District was created on 20 January 2021, previously having been a sub-district of Tuensang District.

On 18 December 2021, three new districts were created: Chümoukedima District and Niuland District carved from Dimapur District and Tseminyü District carved from Kohima District.

On 19 January 2022, Shamator District carved from Tuensang was created as the 16th district of Nagaland.

Districts
The sixteen districts of Nagaland, and their headquarters, 2011 census populations, areas and elevations (of the seat) are:

Subdivisions

Proposed districts 
 Meluri District

References

External links
A Gateway to Districts of India

 
Districts
Nagaland